Nils Opdahl (16 November 1882 – 28 December 1951) was a Norwegian gymnast who competed in the 1912 Summer Olympics.

Biography
He was part of the Norwegian team, which won the gold medal in the gymnastics men's team, free system event. He was born and died in Bergen, was a brother of Jacob Opdahl, and represented Bergens TF.

References

1882 births
1951 deaths
Norwegian male artistic gymnasts
Gymnasts at the 1912 Summer Olympics
Olympic gymnasts of Norway
Olympic gold medalists for Norway
Sportspeople from Bergen
Olympic medalists in gymnastics

Medalists at the 1912 Summer Olympics
20th-century Norwegian people